is an underground metro station located in Naka-ku, Nagoya, Aichi Prefecture, Japan operated by the Nagoya Municipal Subway. It is an interchange station between the Higashiyama Line and the Meijō Line and is located 9.0 rail kilometers from the terminus of the Higashiyama Line at Takabata Station and 3.0 rail kilometers from the terminus of the Meijō Line at Kanayama Station. 
This station is located in part of the upper class district of Nagoya.

History
The new subway system replaced the electric tram which had run above ground. The No. 2 Line (later named the Meijō Line) connected to the station on 15 October 1965. The station was renamed to its present name on 1 June 1966.

Lines

 (Station number: H10)
 (Station number: M05)

Layout
Sakae Station has one underground island platform for use by the Higashiyama Line and two underground opposed side platforms for use by the Meijō Line.

Platforms

The station is rather large and contains many businesses such as restaurants and shops.  There are three sets of gates corresponding to three exits: the Central Exit, the East Exit, and the West Exit.  Past the West Exit are exits 1, 2, 7, and 8.  Exit 3 and Exit 6 are between the Central Exit and the West Exit.  Past the East Exit are exits 4, 4A, and 5.

References

External links

 Sakae Station's web page at the Nagoya Transportation Bureau's web site 

Railway stations in Japan opened in 1957
Railway stations in Aichi Prefecture